Fapore Bk is a village about  south of Amalner in the state of Maharashtra, India. The Bori River runs alongside the village.

References 

Cities and towns in Jalgaon district